Tănătarii Noi is a commune in Căușeni District, Moldova. It is composed of three villages: Ștefănești, Tănătarii Noi and Ursoaia Nouă.

References

Communes of Căușeni District